Home Free may refer to:

Music
 Home Free (group), an American a cappella group
 Home Free (Dan Fogelberg album), 1972
 Home Free (Red Rodney album), 1979
 Homefree, a 2009 album by Fanu
 Homefree, a 2010 album by Nnenna Freelon

Other uses
 Home Free (1993 TV series), an American sitcom
 Home Free (2015 TV series), an American reality series
 Home Free!, a 1964 play by Lanford Wilson
 Wanda Homefree, a fictional character from the comic Little Annie Fanny

See also 
 Free Home, Georgia, US, an unincorporated community